The 1828 United States presidential election in South Carolina took place between October 31 and December 2, 1828, as part of the 1828 United States presidential election. The state legislature chose 11 representatives, or electors to the Electoral College, who voted for President and Vice President.

South Carolina cast 11 eleven electoral votes for the Democratic candidate, Andrew Jackson. These electors were elected by the South Carolina General Assembly, the state legislature, rather than by popular vote.

Results

References

South Carolina
1828
1828 South Carolina elections